Aguas Blancas (Salta) is a village and rural municipality in Salta Province in northwestern Argentina. It is a city in the Oran department, located northeast of the province of Salta, Argentina. Aguas Blancas is located on the right bank of the Bermejo River, which forms a natural boundary between Argentina and Bolivia. The city Bermejo, Bolivia is on the opposite bank of the river.

It has a cluster of farms with novelty horticultural crops and high-value fruits which it exports. These include orange, grapefruit, lemon, mango, papaya, banana, green pepper, tomato, watermelon, pumpkin, melon, strawberry, sweet potato, cassava, and coffee.

Climate

References

Populated places in Salta Province
Argentina–Bolivia border crossings